The Mercedes-Benz OM 636 is a diesel engine that was produced by Daimler-Benz from 1948 until 1990. Being the successor to the OM–138, the OM–636 has been used both as a passenger car engine and as an industrial engine. It saw its first use in the Boehringer Unimog in 1948, prior to its official introduction in the 1949 Mercedes-Benz W–136. Throughout the 1950s, the OM–636 was widely used in the Mercedes-Benz W 120. In 1958, it was succeeded by the OM 621 passenger car engine. However, after the introduction of the OM 621, the OM 636 was kept in production for industrial vehicles such as small lorries, boats, and combine harvesters, until 1990.

The abbreviation OM means Oelmotor (oil engine), and stands for a Daimler-Benz engine that uses any kind of light fuel oil as fuel (diesel engine).

History 

Daimler-Benz began developing the OM–636 during World War II, and had completed the developing process by 1948. According to Carl-Heinz-Vogler, a former Daimler-Benz engineer, the OM–636 was ready for series production in 1948. The pre-series production units made that year were used in the 1948 Boehringer Unimog.

In 1949, the W 136 was offered with the OM 636 displacing 1.7 L pro–ducing . For a short period of time between January 1952 and August 1953, a facelifted version of the W 136 (now having the chassis code W–191) was sold. Its OM 636 was increased in power by 2 PS. In 1953, the W–120 succeeded the W 191, starting in 1954 it was offered with an upgraded version of the OM 636 now displacing 1.8 L and making . After the introduction of the W110 in 1961, the OM 636 was no longer used as a passenger car engine by Daimler-Benz. The production in Germany was stopped in the early 1960s. In Spain, the production continued until 1990.

Technical description 

The OM 636 is a water-cooled inline-four-cylinder diesel engine with precombustion chamber injection, eight valves, OHV valvetrain and wet sump lubrication. It has a cross-flow cylinder head made of grey cast iron. The cylinder block material is also grey cast iron. Both the crankshaft, which is supported in three bearings, and the connection rods are forged. The pistons are made of a light metal alloy. The camshaft is driven by gears, it also drives the inline injection pump. The camshaft and injection pump are placed on the engine's exhaust side.

Technical data

See also
 List of Mercedes-Benz engines

References

Bibliography 

Der 1,8-l-Dieselmotor des Mercedes-Benz 170 Da in: Kraftfahrzeugtechnik 7/1952, p.211-213

External links 

Mercedes-Benz Ponton Technical Data: Diesel Models

OM636
Diesel engines by model
Straight-four engines